Ali Duale is a Canadian politician, who was elected to the Nova Scotia House of Assembly in the 2021 Nova Scotia general election. He represents the riding of Halifax Armdale as a member of the Nova Scotia Liberal Party.

Originally from Somalia, Duale came to Canada as a refugee from the Somalian Civil War, and has worked for the Halifax Fire Department. He was one of four Black Canadians elected to the Nova Scotia legislature in 2021.

Duale is member of the Human Resources and Veterans Affairs Committees.

Electoral record

References

Year of birth missing (living people)
Living people
Nova Scotia Liberal Party MLAs
21st-century Canadian politicians
Black Canadian politicians
Somalian emigrants to Canada